A Word Child is the 17th novel by Iris Murdoch.

First published in 1975 by Chatto and Windus, A Word Child charts the trials and tribulations of the title character, the "word child", Hilary Burde as he attempts to recover his soul from the misery of his troubled past. Filled in the usual Murdoch style with an array of colourful, fully rounded characters who people Hilary's world, the novel is a complex and thoughtful exploration of the possibility and meaning of redemption, the nature of human memory, and the possibility of love for the tarnished soul. By turns stirring, witty, painful and joyous, the novel was received to great critical acclaim on its release.

References

1975 British novels
Novels by Iris Murdoch
Chatto & Windus books
Novels set in London